William Roger Romine (born January 27, 1944 in Doddridge County, West Virginia) is an American politician and a Republican member of the West Virginia House of Delegates representing District 6 since January 2001.

Education
Romine earned his BS from Salem College (now Salem International University) and his MA from West Virginia University.

Elections
2012 Romine and returning 2010 Democratic challenger Charles Delauder won their May 8, 2012 primaries, setting up a rematch; Romine won the November 6, 2012 General election with 4,028 votes (67.5%) against Delauder.
2000 Romine challenged District 6 incumbent Representative James Willison in the 2000 Republican Primary and won, and was unopposed for the November 7, 2000 General election.
2002 Romine was unopposed for both the 2002 Republican Primary and the November 5, 2002 General election.
2004 Romine was unopposed for both the 2004 Republican Primary and the November 2, 2004 General election.
2006 Romine was unopposed for both the 2006 Republican Primary and the November 7, 2006 General election.
2008 Romine was unopposed for both the May 13, 2008 Republican Primary, winning with 2,708 votes, and the November 4, 2008 General election, winning with 5,845 votes.
2010 Romine was unopposed for the May 11, 2010 Republican Primary, winning with 2,403 votes, and won the November 2, 2010 General election with 3,608 votes (69.7%) against Democratic nominee Charles Delauder.

References

External links
Official page at the West Virginia Legislature

William Romine at Ballotpedia
William Roger Romine at the National Institute on Money in State Politics

1944 births
Living people
Republican Party members of the West Virginia House of Delegates
People from Doddridge County, West Virginia
Salem International University alumni
West Virginia University alumni
21st-century American politicians